is a Japanese comedian. He is best known as half of the owarai duo Bakusho Mondai along with Hikari Ota. He also played Mike in the Japanese dub of the Pixar movie Monsters, Inc., Br'er Fox in the Japanese dub of the Disney movie Song of the South (special edition), Shaun in the Japanese dubs of Shaun The Sheep Movie and A Shaun The Sheep Movie: Farmaggedon, and Josh Valentine in the Japanese dub of Godzilla vs. Kong. Tanaka was diagnosed with testicular cancer in 2000, but was successfully treated following surgery.

References

Japanese comedians
Japanese male voice actors
1965 births
Living people
People from Nakano, Tokyo
Male actors from Tokyo
Comedians from Tokyo